Dale Everett Swanson (February 22, 1918 in Castana, IowaJanuary 28, 1996) was an American stock car racing driver and owner.

Swanson lived on Harlan, Iowa, and became one of the premiere racing engine builders in the 1940s and 1950s. Though he started his racing career driving in the coupe circuit in the late 1940s in Nebraska, Iowa, and Missouri, he was better known for his car building expertise. He was often referred to as a "mechanical genius". Swanson owned the cars driven by Harlan native and racing champion Johnny Beauchamp from 1956 to 1957. In the mid-1950s, Swanson was sponsored by Chevrolet's Racing Division to compete in IMCA racing events. Swanson and driver Johnny Beauchamp had stood the IMCA stock car series on its head in 1956 by winning 43 features and running away with the series Championship. Swanson was one of the most knowledgeable mechanics in racing when it came to the Chevrolet.

Another Harlan, Iowa racing legend, 1963 Daytona 500 winner Tiny Lund, also drove for Swanson in the early 1950s.

Swanson's racing work continued up until the late 1970s at racetracks in Iowa and Nebraska.

Personal life

Swanson was the son of Theodore and Neva Swanson.

He died January 28, 1996 in Harlan, Iowa.

References

External links
 

Racing drivers from Iowa
1918 births
1996 deaths
NASCAR team owners
People from Harlan, Iowa